Hamois is a municipality of Wallonia located in the province of Namur, Belgium. 

On 1 January 2020 the municipality had 7,375 inhabitants. The total area is 76.42 km2, giving a population density of 96.5 inhabitants per km2.

The municipality consists of the following districts: Achet, Emptinne, Hamois, Mohiville, Natoye, Schaltin, and Scy.

Mouffrin Castle in Gemenne and Ry Castle are both in Hamois, and continue to be in the possession of the noble Aspremont-Lynden family.

Multiple other castles, still owned and inhabited by other noble families, are spread all over the municipality. One of them, the Castle of Skeuvre, still owned and inhabited by the de Beaudignies family, is noticeably known as the "Spirou Castle", after Franquin got inspiration from it to create the Champignac castle that is depicted in these comics.

See also
 List of protected heritage sites in Hamois

References

External links
 
  

Municipalities of Namur (province)